Wodka Gorbatschow is a German vodka brand. It has been produced in Berlin since 1921. Since 1960, it is owned by the Söhnlein Rheingold AG, a part of the Henkell & Co. Sektkellerei KG, which is owned by Dr. Oetker since 1996.

History
Lev Leontyevitch Gorbachev was the operator of a vodka distillery in St. Petersburg, Russia. During the October Revolution, Gorbachev left his homeland along with his family for Berlin, where he started to produce vodka on April 28, 1921. The brand name, the onion-domed bottle and the blue label were registered by the L. Gorbatschow & Co. as a trademark in 1923.

In 1938, Gorbatschow Liköre J. Kramer & Co. was aryanized as a Jewish company and taken over by pharmacist Otto Ludwig Heinen, who became a member of the Waffen-SS in 1939. Due to various charges, Heinen was sent to SS-Totenkopfverbände and classified as exonerated during denazification in 1946.

Arthur Barth, who had entered the company Gorbatschow-Liköre Dr. Heinen & Co. before the end of the war, became director after Heinen moved back to his hometown Munich. In 1960, the company Gorbatschow-Wodka Arthur Barth was acquired by the Söhnlein Rheingold KG corporate to become marketed nationwide.

Since 1975, the brand's slogan is Des Wodkas reine Seele (English: The pure soul of vodka), alluding to the cliché of the Russian soul. The campaign was launched after Soviet vodka brands had successfully entered the West-German market.

Products

There are different types and bottling sizes of Wodka Gorbatschow. The most common is the 0.7-liter bottle with blue label and 37.5% abv.

References 

German vodkas
German cuisine
German brands
Alcoholic drink brands
Products introduced in 1921
Economy of Berlin
Dr. Oetker